The first Legislative Assembly elections were held in Uttar Pradesh in 1951. The Indian National Congress won by a comfortable margin with 388 of the 430 Vidhan Sabha seats.

Elected members

Important members

References

External links
https://eci.gov.in/statistical-report/statistical-reports/

State Assembly elections in Uttar Pradesh
Uttar Pradesh